Chunakkara is a village in Mavelikara Tahsil of Alappuzha district, in the Indian state of Kerala. It is divided into 5 areas and 15 wards. Nearest railway stations are Kayamlulam railway station and Mavelikara railway station, both are accessible by public and private transports.

Demographics
As per 2011 India census, Chunakkara had a population of 22,730, with 10,372 males and 12,358 females.

Famous personalities 
Famous Malaylalam poet & lyricist Chunakkara Ramankutty, and prominent film actor, producer and politician Mr. Mukesh hails from Chunakkara.

Place to visit 
Annual utsavavam(festival) is normally held between Jan-Feb.

References

Villages in Alappuzha district